Puteri Anetta Komarudin (born 21 August 1993) is an Indonesian politician and a member of the People's Representative Council (DPR) of the Republic of Indonesia. She is a member of the Golkar Party.

Life and career 
She was born in Bandung, Indonesia, on 21 August 1993. She is the daughter of Ade Komarudin, a senior politician from Purwakarta who has served for the DPR for five consecutive terms. She completed her bachelor in economics at the University of Melbourne. She worked as a Junior Bank Supervisor in the Financial Services Authority for three years.

In 2019, she successfully ran as a candidate for the Golkar Party in the Electoral District of West Java VII.

References 

Members of the People's Representative Council, 2019
1993 births
Living people
University of Melbourne alumni politicians
Women members of the People's Representative Council